Heroina (trans. Heroine) was a Yugoslav rock band formed in Novi Sad in 1982. They were a prominent act of the Yugoslav rock scene in the mid-1980s.

History

1982–1986
Heroina was formed in 1982 by Nebojša Živaljević (guitar), Đorđe Stanković (rhythm guitar) and Novica Pavlović (bass guitar). The three previously performed under the name ŠV 20, with some of their demo recordings broadcast on Radio Novi Sad, but with the expansion of new wave in Yugoslavia, they decided to change their musical direction and move towards more new wave-oriented sound.

In 1983, they were joined by Stevan Dostan (drums), Dejan Isakov (keyboards) and Zoran Janjetov (vocals), who was at the time a well-known comic book artist. The band performed across Yugoslavia. At their performances in Zagreb clubs Lapidarij, Kulušić and SKUC, Laboratorija Zvuka saxophonist Deže Molnar performed with them. The demo version of the song "Momo" achieved certain success on Yugoslav radio stations.

During the recording of the band's debut album Pavlović and Dostan left the band, so the album was recorded with rhythm machine, which was programmed by Karlowy Vary member Tomo in der Mühlen, and with bass guitarist Aleksandar "Caki" Kravić. The band was persuaded to use rhythm machine instead of drums by the album producer, Mitar Subotić. The album featured Deže Molnar on saxophone and Hungarian jazz musician Rudolf Tomsits on trumpet. The album, entitled simply Heroina and featuring artwork designed by Janjetov (he created the painting on the cover in only two hours), was released through PGP-RTB in 1985. The album presented the band's version of art rock, and although the members of the band were not entirely satisfied with the results of the recordings, the album was well received by the audience. The band continued to perform, changing several rhythm sections, ending their activity in 1986.

Post breakup
Janjetov continued his career as a comic book artist, achieving large success on the French comics scene. In 1986, he was chosen by Moebius to continue his work on The Incal. He illustrated Avant l'Incal and The Technopriests, written by Alejandro Jodorowsky.

Dejan Isakov died in 2000.

Discography

Studio albums
Heroina (1985)

References

External links
 Heroina at Discogs

Serbian rock music groups
Serbian art rock groups
Yugoslav rock music groups
Yugoslav art rock groups
Funk rock musical groups
Art pop groups
Musical groups from Novi Sad
Musical groups established in 1982
Musical groups disestablished in 1986
1982 establishments in Yugoslavia